Héctor Téran Terán (April 3, 1931 – October 4, 1998) was a Mexican politician, member of the National Action Party (PAN), and governor of the state of Baja California.

Héctor Terán Terán received his degree in Large Business Administration from the Centro de Enseñanza Técnica y Superior (CETYS), and was made leader of his party in  the state of Baja California. He was a governor-candidate three times: in 1977, when he lost to the PRI candidate Roberto de la Madrid Romandia; in 1983, when he lost to Xicoténcatl Leyva Mortera; and finally in 1995, when he triumphed, becoming the second PAN governor of Baja California.

Previously, he was a deputy (diputado) in the Congress of Baja California between 1980 and 1983; a federal deputy  (diputado federal) in the 53rd Legislature from 1985 to 1988; and in 1989, Baja California's first governor from the PAN, Ernesto Ruffo Appel, appointed him to be the Secretario General de Gobierno (State Secretary General), holding this position until 1991 when he was elected to the federal Senate, becoming the first PAN senator in history.  He asked the permission of the Senate to be the candidate for Governor of Baja California and won in the 1995 state election, assuming his post on November 1 of the same year.

Héctor Terán Terán died of a heart attack in office on October 4, 1998, while exercising on the Governor's Estate.

See also
Governors of Baja California
Baja California

References

External links
Biografías de los gobernadores del estado de Baja California. (es) 

1931 births
1998 deaths
Governors of Baja California
Members of the Chamber of Deputies (Mexico)
Members of the Senate of the Republic (Mexico)
National Action Party (Mexico) politicians
Members of the Congress of Baja California
People from Moctezuma, Sonora
Politicians from Sonora
20th-century Mexican politicians